Riencourt-lès-Bapaume (literally Riencourt near Bapaume) is a commune in the Pas-de-Calais department in the Hauts-de-France region of France.

Geography

Population

Places of interest
 The church of Notre-Dame, rebuilt along with all of the village after World War I.
 The Commonwealth War Graves Commission cemetery.

See also
Communes of the Pas-de-Calais department

References

External links

 The CWGC cemetery

Riencourtlesbapaume